Edward M. Flynn is an American politician currently serving as the president of the Boston City Council, a position that he has held since January 2022. He has been a member of the Boston City Council from its 2nd district since January 2017.

Early life and career

Flynn was born to Raymond Flynn and Kathy Flynn. Flynn's father was mayor of Boston from 1984 through 1993, and was also a ambassador of the United States to the Holy See from 1993 through 1997, a member of the Boston City Council from 1978 through 1984, and a member of the Massachusetts House of Representatives from 1971 through 1978.

Flynn was one of six siblings. Flynn graduated high school at Boston's Don Bosco Technical High School. He graduated college at Salve Regina College, where he studied history and government.

Flynn served in the United States Navy for 25 years, becoming a second-class petty officer. He served active duty in the Persian Gulf on two deployments, and had further service abroad in the United States Naval Reserves. His military service included Operation Enduring Freedom. In the United States Navy Reserves, one of his assignments was assisting in the coordination of disaster relief after the 2010 Haiti earthquake.

Flynn worked as a probation officer in the Suffolk Superior Court, as a state public safety official, as a legislative affairs specialist at the United States Department of Labor, and as a transpiration logistical specialist with the United States Department of Defense's Joint Task Force-Armed Forces Inaugural Committee for the 2005 United States presidential inauguration. At the Department of Labor, where he worked for five years during the Clinton administration, he worked on matters related to expanding access to affordable healthcare and efforts to increase the federal minimum wage.

In 2006, Flynn moved back to Boston from Washington, D.C., settling in South Boston and beginning work as a substitute teacher at Charlestown High School. In April 2006, a month after resettling in Boston, Flynn initially declared that he had intended to run for an at-large seat in the 2007 Boston City Council election. He cited youth substance abuse as a key issue he intended to focus on, declaring that, "OxyContin and heroin are an epidemic now, in every neighborhood. I would like to try to get the business community involved".

Flynn held membership in a number of Bostonian civic organizations, including the Cityside Neighborhood Association, Veterans of Foreign Wars Thomas M. Fitzgerald Post, Ward 7 Democratic Committee, and South Boston Citizens' Association.

City Council

First term (2019–2022)

Election
Flynn was elected to the Boston City Council's 2nd district seat in 2017 being vacated by outgoing Councilmember Bill Linehan. He defeated LGBTQ activist Mike Kelley by over three percentage points to win election.

During the campaign, Flynn was considered the front-runner. Among those who endorsed his candidacy were Congressman Stephen F. Lynch, City Councilor Bill Linehan, City Councilor Michael F. Flaherty, and State Representative Nick Collins. He was also endorsed by a number of trade unions.

Among the issues that Flynn pledged would be a priority for him if he was elected was domestic violence. He invoked the work his mother had done as the city's first lady to support survivors of domestic violence, promising to continue her work.

In mid-October 2017, Councilor Bill Linehan made a resignation from the seat that Flynn was seeking to succeed him in, which is when Linehan also gave his endorsement of Flynn's candidacy to succeed him.

After joining the City Council, Flynn stopped working as a probation officer at the Suffolk Superior Court.

Council activities
Having been elected to fill a vacant seat, Flynn took office after the vote had been certified, beginning his tenure during the 2015–2018 Boston City Council term, as opposed to taking his seat months later at the start of the new 2018–21 Boston City Council term.

Flynn is only the second individual to hold the council's 2nd district seat since it was established in 1984.

In December 2018, the Boston City Council unanimously voted to pass an ordinance that Flynn authored with Lydia Edwards that extended the period of repayment for back taxes by low-income elder residents, and forgave interest.

Second term (2019–2022)
Flynn was reelected in 2019.

In 2021, Flynn voted against legislation that was passed by the City Council which restricted the use of rubber bullets, tear gas, and pepper spray by the Boston Police Department.

Third term and council presidency (2022–present)

Reelection to the City Council
Flynn was reelected to his city council seat in 2021.

Campaign for council presidency
On the Boston City Council, its president is elected by a vote of its members. The campaign process of those seeking the presidency generally occurs behind closed doors, with the contenders privately lobbying and negotiating with members of the council for their votes. Initially, after the new council had been elected, rumors initially arose that Kenzie Bok had secured the backing of enough City Council members to be elected the City Council's president for its 2022–23 term. It has been reported by the press that sources have said was initially the case, but that Flynn (who had initially pledged to support Bok for president) and two additional councilors decided to withdraw their backing of her candidacy, and partnered with a coalition of newly elected freshman City Council members to support Flynn to serve as the president, giving Flynn sufficient support to win the presidency.

On December 1, 2021, Flynn announced in a press release that he had secured guarantees of support from enough council members that he was confident he would be voted by the city council to serve as its president of the Boston City Council during its 2022–23 term. WGBH-TV reported that numerous sources had informed them that Flynn had indeed received support from enough councilors to win the position. It was reported that the councilors who had rival efforts for the council presidency had been Ricardo Arroyo and Kenzie Bok. It was noted that it was possible that councilors could potentially shift their support before the January vote. However, upon Flynn's apparent success in securing sufficient backing to become council president, Arroyo released a statement that acted as an informal concession of sorts, giving strong praise to Flynn's kindness and work ethic, and declaring that he looked forward, "to seeing how he utilizes those great qualities in this leadership role." Flynn ultimately was elected unanimously to the council presidency in the formal vote.

Political reporter Saraya Wintersmith of WGBH-TV opined that, while the position of City Council president was mostly a symbolic post, it was poised to take more political importance than usual in the Boston City Council's 2022–23 term, with the council set to receive greater power in the city's budgeting process and poised to play a role in determining new appointees to seats on the Boston School Committee.

Council activities

Flynn was one of four council members that voted against the redistricting map for City Council districts that the council passed and Mayor Michelle Wu passed into law in November 2022. Flynn had desired to keep all of South Boston and the South End in the boundaries of his own district, which the new map does not do. Flynn had attempted to delay the adoption of a new redistricting map, and proposed to instead have an independent panel draw the new map. The redistricting process had been contentious.

As council president, Flynn suspended Councilman Ricardo Arroyo from his committee chairmanships after it was reported in the Boston Globe that Arroyo had been investigated for sexual assault in 2005 and 2007 without being charged for a crime.

In August 2022, ahead of month-long closure of a key segment of the MBTA Orange Line, Flynn and several other city councilors wrote a letter to the MBTA that requested the operation of shuttle bus service to Chinatown during the closure. He expressed worry that the MBTA was not including Chinatown in its plan for alternate transit during the closure.

Political views
Flynn is a member of the Democratic Party.

Political analysis about Flynn
In March 2022, in advance of the vote for president of the City Council, reporter Danny McDonald wrote a profile on Flynn for The Boston Globe. In the profile, he opined that, "you’d have a hard time crafting a figure more emblematic of Boston’s old power structure" than Flynn, noting that Flynn was white, middle ageed, Irish Catholic, a Boston native, and a political heir. McDonald noted that these were attribute that had, for a long time, been characteristics of a large share of past Boston City Councils. He opined that this posed an interesting contrast with the reality that the Boston City Council had seen its membership rapidly diversify over the past several elections. McDoanld also opined that Flynn's representation of the city's "old power structure" contrasted with the "new power structure" that he believed that Boston had embraced, which he argued had been emblemized by the 2021 election of, "an unabashedly progressive mayor, Michelle Wu, and a historically diverse council that continues to tack to the left". McDonald also characterized Flynn as an individual that generally sought to avoid media attention, preferring that the media instead focus their attention on his City Council colleagues.

Personal life
Flynn and his wife Kristen have two children. Flynn is Irish Catholic. He lives in South Boston.

Electoral history

References

Boston City Council members
Massachusetts Democrats
Year of birth missing (living people)
United States Navy personnel of the War in Afghanistan (2001–2021)
Living people